The 2019–20 Seton Hall Pirates men's basketball team represented Seton Hall University in the 2019–20 NCAA Division I men's basketball season. They are led by tenth-year head coach Kevin Willard. The Pirates played their home games at the Prudential Center in Newark, New Jersey and Walsh Gymnasium in South Orange, New Jersey as members of the Big East Conference. They finished the season 21–9, 13–5 in Big East play, which put them in a three-way tie for first place. As the No. 3 seed in the Big East tournament, they were slated to play Marquette in the quarterfinals, but the Tournament was cancelled due to the COVID-19 pandemic, along with the rest of the NCAA postseason.

Previous season
The Pirates finished the 2018–19 season 20–14, 9–9 in Big East play to finish in a four-way tie for third place. In the Big East tournament, they defeated Georgetown in the quarterfinals and Marquette in the semifinals before losing to Villanova by two points in the final. They received an at-large bid to the NCAA tournament as the No. 10 seed in the Midwest region and were defeated by No. 7 seed Wofford in the first round.

Offseason

Departures

Incoming transfers

Class of 2019 recruits

Roster

Schedule and results

|-
!colspan=9 style=| Exhibition

|-
!colspan=9 style=| Non-conference regular season

|-
!colspan=9 style=|Big East regular season

|-

!colspan=9 style="|Big East tournament

Rankings

 On January 20, the Pirates achieved their 1st Top 10 ranking in 20 years, when they were ranked #8 on December 18, 2000.
 On March 2, the Pirates were ranked at #8 in the AP Poll, their highest ranking since reaching #7 in 2001.

References

Seton Hall
Seton Hall Pirates men's basketball seasons
Seton Hall
Seton Hall